Secor may refer to:

Places

United States
 Secor, Illinois, village 
 Secor, Iowa, ghost town

People
 T. F. Secor  (1808–1901), American marine engineer
 Martin Mathias Secor (1841–1911), American businessman and politician
 Lella Secor Florence (1887–1966), American writer and activist
 George Secor (1943–2020), American musical theorist
 The eponymous secor (interval)
 Kyle Secor (born 1957), American actor
 Ketch Secor (fl. 21st cen.), American musician of Old Crow Medicine Show

See also
SECORE (marine conservation organization)